Blood is the second studio album by Canadian/Danish R&B duo Rhye released in February 2018 under Loma Vista Recordings.

Release
On October 31, 2017, Rhye released the first single from the album, "Taste". The second single "Count to Five" was released on December 11, 2017, along with the announcement of the new album. On February 15, 2018, Rhye released the music video to "Song For You".

Tour
In October 2017, Rhye announced a European tour for February 2018, starting in Mexico City, and finishing in April 2018 in England.

Critical reception
Blood was met with "generally favorable" reviews from critics. At Metacritic, which assigns a weighted average rating out of 100 to reviews from mainstream publications, this release received an average score of 71, based on 19 reviews. Aggregator Album of the Year gave the release a 73 out of 100 based on a critical consensus of 15 reviews.

Accolades

Track listing
Track listing adapted from Tidal.

Personnel
Credits adapted from AllMusic.

Musicians
 Michael Milosh – lead vocalist, drums, engineer
 Claire Courchene – cello, trombone
 Nate Mercereau – bass, guitar
 Tamar Osborn – clarinet
 Justin Parker – guitar
 Paul Pfisterer – bass
 Benjamin Schwier – keyboard
 Leah Zeger – violin
 Thomas Lea – violin

Production
 Thomas Bartlett – engineer, producer
 Patrick Dillett – mixer
 Itai Shapira – engineer
 J.J. Wiesler – engineer
 Carrie Smith – design
 King Henry – engineer, bass, keyboards
 Joe LaPorta – mastering

Charts

Release history

References

External links
 
 

2018 albums
Loma Vista Recordings albums
Rhye albums